The largest remainder method (also known as Hare–Niemeyer method, Hamilton method or as Vinton's method) is one way of allocating seats proportionally for representative assemblies with party list voting systems.  It contrasts with various highest averages methods (also known as divisor methods).

Method
The largest remainder method requires the numbers of votes for each party to be divided by a quota representing the number of votes required for a seat (i.e. usually the total number of votes cast divided by the number of seats, or some similar formula). The result for each party will usually consist of an integer part plus a fractional remainder. Each party is first allocated a number of seats equal to their integer. This will generally leave some remainder seats unallocated: the parties are then ranked on the basis of the fractional remainders, and the parties with the largest remainders are each allocated one additional seat until all the seats have been allocated. This gives the method its name.

Quotas
There are several possibilities for the quota. The most common are:
the Hare quota and the Droop quota. The use of a particular quota with the largest remainders method is often abbreviated as "LR-[quota name]", such as "LR-Droop".

The Hare (or simple) quota is defined as follows

It is used for legislative elections in Russia (with a 5% exclusion threshold since 2016), Ukraine (5% threshold), Bulgaria (4% threshold), Lithuania (5% threshold for party and 7% threshold for coalition), Tunisia, Taiwan (5% threshold), Namibia and Hong Kong. The Hamilton method of apportionment is actually a largest-remainder method which uses the Hare Quota. It is named after Alexander Hamilton, who invented the largest-remainder method in 1792. It was first adopted to apportion the U.S. House of Representatives every ten years between 1852 and 1900.

The Droop quota is the integer part of

and is applied in elections in South Africa. The Hagenbach-Bischoff quota is virtually identical, being

either used as a fraction or rounded up.

The Hare quota tends to be slightly more generous to less popular parties and the Droop quota to more popular parties. This means that Hare can arguably be considered more proportional than Droop quota. However, an example shows that the Hare quota can fail to guarantee that a party with a majority of votes will earn at least half of the seats (though even the Droop quota can very rarely do so).

The Imperiali quota

is rarely used since it suffers from the defect that it might result in more seats being allocated than there are available (this can also occur with the Hagenbach-Bischoff quota but it is very unlikely, and it is impossible with the Hare and Droop quotas). This will certainly happen if there are only two parties. In such a case, it is usual to increase the quota until the number of candidates elected is equal to the number of seats available, in effect changing the voting system to the Jefferson apportionment formula (see D'Hondt method).

Examples
These examples take an election to allocate 10 seats where there are 100,000 votes.

Hare quota

Droop quota

Pros and cons
It is relatively easy for a voter to understand how the largest remainder method allocates seats. The Hare quota gives an advantage to smaller parties while the Droop quota favours larger parties. However, whether a list gets an extra seat or not may well depend on how the remaining votes are distributed among other parties: it is quite possible for a party to make a slight percentage gain yet lose a seat if the votes for other parties also change. A related feature is that increasing the number of seats may cause a party to lose a seat (the so-called Alabama paradox). The highest averages methods avoid this latter paradox; but since no apportionment method is entirely free from paradox, they introduce others like quota violation (see Quota rule).

Technical evaluation and paradoxes
The largest remainder method satisfies the quota rule (each party's seats amount to its ideal share of seats, either rounded up or rounded down) and was designed to satisfy that criterion. However, that comes at the cost of paradoxical behaviour. The Alabama paradox is exhibited when an increase in seats apportioned leads to a decrease in the number of seats allocated to a certain party. In the example below, when the number of seats to be allocated is increased from 25 to 26 (with the number of votes held constant), parties D and E counterintuitively end up with fewer seats.

With 25 seats, the results are:

With 26 seats, the results are:

References

External links
 Hamilton method experimentation applet at cut-the-knot

Party-list proportional representation
Apportionment methods